The 1999 Meath Senior Football Championship was the 107th edition of the Meath GAA's premier club Gaelic football tournament for senior graded teams in County Meath, Ireland. The tournament consists of 16 teams, with the winner going on to represent Meath in the Leinster Senior Club Football Championship. The championship starts with a group stage and then progresses to a knock out stage.  
 
St. Peter's Dunboyne were the defending champions after they defeated Oldcastle in the previous years final, however in this year's campaign they failed to progress past the group phase. They were chosen to represent Meath in the 1999 Leinster Senior Club Football Championship as the Meath SFC was still ongoing by the first round of the Leinster Club SFC at the beginning of November.

Blackhall Gaels were promoted after claiming the 1998 Meath Intermediate Football Championship title, their first Intermediate win and hence their first period as a Senior club.

On 21 November 2000, Skryne claimed their 11th Senior Championship title with a 1-12 to 0-8 win over Dunshaughlin in the final. Mick O'Dowd raised the Keegan Cup for Skryne while All-Star Trevor Giles claimed the 'Man of the Match' award.

This year, automatic promotion and relegation were introduced to the Meath SFC and IFC. This means that clubs in the top two grades can no longer afford to lose a few championship games without putting their status in serious peril. In bygone times, when clubs had to apply for demotion, the championship had stagnated, leading to the non-fulfillment of fixtures as the competitions meandered towards their conclusions. Carnaross and Slane were the first clubs to feel the wrath of relegation. Carnaross were relegated after 6 years in the senior grade while Slane were relegated after 15 years as a senior club.

Team changes
The following teams have changed division since the 1998 championship season.

To S.F.C.
Promoted from I.F.C.
 Blackhall Gaels  -  (Intermediate Champions)

From S.F.C.
Regraded to I.F.C.
 St. Michael's

Group stage

Group A

Round 1:
 Skryne 0-14, 2-8 Moynalvey, Summerhill, 4/4/1999,
 Dunderry 1-12, 1-10 Blackhall Gaels, 18/4/1999,
 Oldcastle  -  Bye,

Round 2:
 Dunderry w, l Oldcastle,                    
 Blackhall Gaels 0-11, 0-6 Moynalvey,
 Skryne  -  Bye,

Round 3:
 Skryne 0-12, 0-12 Oldcastle, 13/6/1999,
 Dunderry 2-11, 1-10 Moynalvey, 13/6/1999,
 Blackhall Gaels  -  Bye,

Round 4:
 Skryne 2-13, 1-8 Dunderry, 11/7/1999,
 Blackhall Gaels 1-9, 0-10 Oldcastle, 11/7/1999,
 Moynalvey  -  Bye,

Round 5:
 Skryne 0-18, 1-9 Blackhall Gaels, 5/9/1999,
 Oldcastle 3-13, 1-9 Moynalvey, 5/9/1999,
 Dunderry  -  Bye,

Group B

Round 1:
 Ballinlough 0-14, 0-10 Gaeil Colmcille, Drumbaragh, 4/4/1999,
 Seneschalstown 1-12, 1-7 Carnaross, Kells, 4/4/1999,
 Summerhill  -  Bye,

Round 2:
 Summerhill 2-15, 2-7 Carnaross, 2/5/1999,
 Ballinlough 0-12, 0-12, Seneschalstown, 2/5/1999,
 Gaeil Colmcille  -  Bye,

Round 3:
 Summerhill 0-12, 1-5 Gaeil Colmcille, 13/6/1999,
 Carnaross 2-12, 2-9 Ballinlough, 13/6/1999,
 Seneschalstown  -  Bye,

Round 4:
 Ballinlough 0-16, 1-10 Summerhill, 5/9/1999,
 Seneschalstown 2-9, 0-13 Gaeil Colmcille, 5/9/1999,
 Carnarosss  -  Bye,

Round 5:
 Summerhill 1-14, 2-6 Seneschalstown, 11/7/1999,
 Gaeil Colmcille 0-13, 1-7 Carnaross, 11/7/1999,
 Ballinlough  -  Bye,

Quarter-final Play Off:
 Ballinlough 1-5, 1-4 Seneschalstown, 3/10/1999,

Relegation Play Off:
 Gaeil Colmcille 0-15, 1-6 Carnaross, Carlanstown, 10/10/1999,

Group C

Round 1:
 Slane 1-12, 2-8 Cortown, Walterstown, 4/4/1999,
 Simonstown Gaels 1-10, 0-12 Kilmainhamwood, Pairc Tailteann, 4/4/1999,
 Navan O'Mahonys  -  Bye,

Round 2:
 Kilmainhamwood 0-13, 0-8 Slane, 2/5/1999,
 Cortown 1-10, 0-12 Navan O'Mahonys, 2/5/1999,
 Simonstown Gaels  -  Bye,

Round 3:
 Simonstown Gaels 1-8, 0-9 Navan O'Mahonys, 13/6/1999,
 Cortown +1, -1 Kilmainhamwood,
 Slane  -  Bye,

Round 4:
 Navan O'Mahonys 2-6, 1-8 Slane, 11/7/1999,
 Cortown 1-15, 2-7 Simonstown Gaels, 11/7/1999,
 Kilmainhamwood  -  Bye,

Round 5:
 Simonstown Gaels 5-11, 0-8 Slane, 5/9/1999,
 Navan O'Mahonys 1-18, 1-7 Kilmainhamwood, 5/9/1999,
 Cortown  -  Bye,

Relegation Play Off:
 Kilmainhamwood 1-13, 1-10 Slane, 10/10/1999,

Group D

Round 1:
 Walterstown 2-9, 0-8 Dunshaughlin, Pairc Tailteann, 4/4/1999,
 Trim 0-8, 0-6 St. Peter's Dunboyne, 18/4/1999,

Round 2:
 Dunshaughlin 1-8, 1-7 St. Peter's Dunboyne, 20/6/1999,                
 Walterstown w, l Trim,

Round 3:
 Dunshaughlin 0-18, 0-12 Trim, 10/7/1999,
 St. Peter's Dunboyne 1-11, 2-7 Walterstown, 11/7/1999,

Relegation Play Off:
 St. Peter's Dunboyne 0-12, 1-8 Trim, 3/10/1999,

Knock-out Stage

Relegation Play Off
 Moynalvey 1-8, 1-7 Slane, Walterstown, 24/10/1999,
 Trim 0-11, 1-8 Carnaross, Kilberry, 24/10/1999,
 Trim 3-9, 3-4 Carnaross, Kilberry, 7/11/1999,

Finals

Quarter-final:
 Dunshaughlin 1-10, 1-7 Simonstown Gaels, Pairc Tailteann, 3/10/1999,
 Walterstown 1-11, 1-11 Cortown, Pairc Tailteann, 10/10/1999,
 Skryne 1-10, 1-9 Ballinlough, Pairc Tailteann, 17/10/1999,
 Dunderry 0-11, 0-11 Summerhill, Pairc Tailteann, 17/10/1999,

Quarter-final Replay:
 Dunderry 1-15, 0-15 Summerhill, Pairc Tailteann, 24/10/1999,
 Walterstown 0-16, 1-8 Cortown, Pairc Tailteann, 24/10/1999,

Semi-final:
 Skryne 0-14, 0-8 Walterstown, Pairc Tailteann, 6/11/1999,
 Dunshaughlin 1-8, 2-2 Dunderry, Pairc Tailteann, 7/11/1999,

Final:
 Skryne 1-12, 0-8 Dunshaughlin, Pairc Tailteann, 21/11/1999,

Leinster Senior Club Football Championship
Quarter-final:
 Sarsfields 1-15, 0-6 St. Peter's Dunboyne, St. Conleth's Park, 7/11/1999,

References

External links

Meath Senior Football Championship
Meath Senior Football Championship